Rhascus was one of the last Odrysian kings of Thrace, ruling from 18 BC to 11 BC.

References

See also 
 List of Thracian tribes

1st-century BC rulers in Europe
Thracian kings